Elections were held in Dufferin County, Ontario on October 25, 2010 in conjunction with municipal elections across the province.

Dufferin County Council

Amaranth

East Garafraxa

East Luther Grand Valley

Melancthon

Mono

Mulmur

Orangeville

Shelburne

References

2010 Ontario municipal elections
Dufferin County